Michael William Hart (born 1956) has been Fellow in Politics at Exeter College, Oxford since 1982.

His research interests include British Politics since 1880 and Modern Southern Africa. He lectures on British Politics and Government since 1900.

He took his first degree at Emmanuel College, University of Cambridge, winning a double First, and went to University of Oxford to research his doctorate on the decline of the British Liberal Party. He spent some time at Magdalene College, Cambridge as a Junior Research Fellow before taking up his current Fellowship. Besides academic positions, he has also served as a Junior Proctor in the University of Oxford and as sub-Rector at Exeter.

Hart has been quoted on numerous occasions by The Times and The Telegraph during general election periods, campaigned against apartheid in South Africa and has been a Liberal Party Councillor on Oxford City Council. Philosophically, he is a liberal, but combines this with a belief in the need for a strong state.

References

British political scientists
Fellows of Exeter College, Oxford
Fellows of Magdalene College, Cambridge
1956 births
Living people
Members of Oxford City Council
Alumni of Emmanuel College, Cambridge
Alumni of the University of Oxford
People educated at Whitgift School